commonly known as , due to sponsorship reason is a multi-purpose stadium in Nara, capital of Nara Prefecture, Japan.  It is currently used mostly for football matches. The stadium holds 30,600 people. Currently home of J.League club, Nara Club

History
Kōnoike Athletic Stadium officially open in 31 march 1983. Renovation stadium in 2009.

Nara Club hosted stadium in J3 League match against Matsumoto Yamaga on 5 march 2023.

Events
 The 39th National Sports Festival of Japan autumn (a.k.a. ), Main venue in 1984.
 The Inter-highschool championships 2009, Main venue in 2009.

References

Football venues in Japan
Athletics (track and field) venues in Japan
Multi-purpose stadiums in Japan
Sports venues in Nara Prefecture
Nara Club
Buildings and structures in Nara, Nara
Sports venues completed in 1983
1983 establishments in Japan